Raymond Owes (born December 11, 1972 in San Bernardino, California) is an American former professional basketball player. He was listed at 204 cm 102 kg. He played small forward and for the University of Arizona (1991–95), and was named first-team All-Pac-10 in 1995.

Owes played 24 games for the NBA's Golden State Warriors during the 1996-97 season, averaging 3.1 points and 2.9 rebounds per game. He also played in the Australian NBL for the Geelong Supercats and Townsville Crocodiles. While playing for Geelong, Owes was selected to the 1996 All-NBL team as a Power forward.

References

External links
NBA stats @ basketballreference.com
College stats at sportsstats.com

1972 births
Living people
African-American basketball players
American expatriate basketball people in Australia
American men's basketball players
Arizona Wildcats men's basketball players
Basketball players from California
Golden State Warriors players
Small forwards
Sportspeople from San Bernardino, California
Townsville Crocodiles players
Undrafted National Basketball Association players
21st-century African-American sportspeople
20th-century African-American sportspeople